Tao-Rusyr Caldera is a stratovolcano located at the southern end of Onekotan Island, Kuril Islands, Russia. It has 7.5 km wide caldera formed during a catastrophic eruption less than 10,000 years ago (reported ages range from 5,550 to 9,400 Before Present). The waters of Kol'tsevoe Lake (Ring Lake) fill the caldera, along with a large symmetrical andesitic cone, Krenitsyn Peak, that rises as an island within the lake. This volcano was named after Captain Pyotr Krenitsyn of the Imperial Russian Navy.

The most recent eruption, in 1952, formed a small lava dome on the island's coast. Krenitsyn Peak has a summit crater 350 m wide and is the highest point of the volcano and on the entire Onekotan Island.  Another caldera, Nemo Peak, lies at the northern end of the island, and it also contains a central cone and crater lake.

The event has been potentially identified in the GISP2 ice core.

The caldera forming eruption wiped out vegetation on southern Onekotan, and it took a long time for it to recover. Only one historical eruption occurred at Tao-Rusyr, just after the 1952 Severo-Kurilsk earthquake.

See also
 List of volcanoes in Russia

References

External links 
 
 Volcanic Activity and Recent Tephras in the Kuril Islands: Field Result during the International Kuril Island Project (IKIP) 2000
 

Onekotan
Calderas of Russia
Volcanic crater lakes
Stratovolcanoes of Russia
Active volcanoes
VEI-6 volcanoes
Volcanoes of the Kuril Islands
Mountains of the Kuril Islands
Holocene calderas